Atlantis basin is an eroded impact crater in the southern hemisphere of Mars, in the Phaethontis quadrangle, Sirenum Terrae region, centered at 177° West, 35° South. It was formed during the early Noachian period.

Atlantis basin contains Atlantis Chaos, a region of chaos terrain. It also contains an ancient dry lakebed (possibly part of Eridania Lake), as well as structures that appear to be volcanic dikes and recently formed gullies, which suggests the possibility of long-term hydrothermal activity.

See also 
 Geography of Mars
 Areas of chaos terrain on Mars

References 

Phaethontis quadrangle